Diel vertical migration is a pattern of movement used by some organisms living in oceans and lakes.

Diel may also refer to:

People with the surname Diel
 Adrian Diel (1756–1839), German physician and founder of pomology
 Paul Diel (1893–1972), French psychologist
 Charles Diel, former head men's tennis coach for Louisiana State University Tigers

See also
 Diels, a surname
 Diurnality
 Thiel (disambiguation), an etymologically related surname